The Musée du Service des Objets Trouvés, also known as the Petit musée des objets trouvés, is a small museum of articles maintained by the Service des Objets Trouvés (Lost and Found Department) of the Paris Police. It is located in the 15th arrondissement at 36, rue des Morillons, Paris, France. Although it is located within the public lost and found repository, the museum itself is not generally open to the public.

A thousand objects are lost every day in the suburbs and airports of Paris, found by others and brought to the police department or placed in a mailbox to be delivered to the museum. The top three objects found: identity documents, keys and glasses. In 2011, 186,000 objects were found and delivered to the museum for recovery.

The museum is mentioned, along with a number of other small museums in Paris, in chapter 81 of The Museum of Innocence by Nobel prize winner Orhan Pamuk.

See also  
 List of museums in Paris

References 

 Le Service des Objets Trouves de la Préfecture de Police (French)

Museums in Paris
Buildings and structures in the 15th arrondissement of Paris
Lost and found
National Police (France)